Dakota's Summer is a 2014 independently produced family drama,  written and directed by Timothy Armstrong, and starring Haley Ramm and Keith Carradine. It is a sequel to the 2012 film Cowgirls 'n Angels. The film premiered at the 2014 Dallas International Film Festival.

Plot
Dakota Rose (Haley Ramm) dreams of following in her famous family's footsteps and becoming a champion trick rider. However the shocking news that she was in fact adopted at birth leads her to question both herself and her place in her family's legacy.

Cast
 Haley Ramm as Dakota Rose
 Keith Carradine as Austin Rose
 Jade Pettyjohn as Summer Jennings 
 Emily Bett Rickards as Kristin Rose
 Marin Hinkle as Clara
 Julie Ann Emery as Annie Cayne 
 Bryan Dechart as Taylor Chase
 Spencer Boldman as Bryce
 Leslie-Anne Huff as Madison De La Cruz 
 Glynn Turman as Isaac Benson 
 Kimberly Whalen as Dawn Morton

Production

Casting
In July 2013, it was announced that Spencer Boldman would be starring in the movie, opposite Haley Ramm.

Filming
The film was originally planned to be filmed in Texas but producer Ben Feingold took the decision to relocate the production to Louisiana just weeks before shooting was due to begin because of tax credit incentives offered by the state. Much of the filming took place in the town of Keachi.

Ramm had previous experience horse-riding but was only permitted to perform limited 'horse-tricks', due to concerns that the actress may get hurt. The majority of the horse-riding stunts featured in the film were performed by Texas based all-female trick-riding group 'The Dynamite Dames'.

Soundtrack
Country artist Amber Hayes recorded a cover version of "Cotton-Eyed Joe" for the film, produced by Charles Kelley. The singer appears in a cameo role in the film, performing the track. Her original track "Home" also features on the film's soundtrack.

Release
The film premiered at the 2014 Dallas International Film Festival. The film was released digitally on April 1, 2014, and on DVD on April 25, 2014.

References

External links

2014 films
American independent films
Films about horses
Horse sports in film
Direct-to-video sequel films
2010s English-language films
2010s American films